Francis Scott Key Mall is an enclosed shopping mall in Frederick, Maryland. Opened in 1978, it is anchored by JCPenney, Macy's, Value City Furniture, DSW, Ethan Allen, Barnes & Noble, and Dick's Sporting Goods.

History
Original anchors at Francis Scott Key Mall in 1978 included Sears, Hess's, and Gee Bee. The mall was then owned by Crown American. It was the second mall serving Frederick, the first being Frederick Towne Mall, which opened six years prior. Leggett, now Belk, opened at the mall in 1991. The store was sold in 1996 to JCPenney, who relocated from Frederick Towne Mall. Woolworth, an original tenant, closed in the mid-1990s. Its space was divided among smaller stores. Also, Hess's sold its store to Hecht's in 1995. Hecht's became Macy's in 2006.

Barnes & Noble opened a store in the mall in 2007. Value City operated out of the former Gee Bee building from 1992 until 2008, when it was converted to Value City Furniture and DSW. Dick's Sporting Goods opened in a new building outside close to Sears and Value City/DSW in 2014. 

On December 12, 2022, it was announced that Sears would be closing on January 15, 2023. This was the last Sears store in the state of Maryland to stay open.

References

External links
Official website

Shopping malls in Maryland
Shopping malls established in 1978
Pennsylvania Real Estate Investment Trust
Buildings and structures in Frederick, Maryland
1978 establishments in Maryland